Roberto Salcedo may refer to:

 Roberto Salcedo Jr. (born 1979), Dominican comedian
 Roberto Salcedo Sr. (born 1953), Dominican politician
 Roberto Alejandro Salcedo (born 1991), Mexican footballer